Tibor Balog (born 31 August 1963) is a retired Hungarian football defender.

References

1963 births
Living people
Hungarian footballers
Vasas SC players
Újpest FC players
AS Verbroedering Geel players
Sint-Truidense V.V. players
K.S.K. Heist players
Association football defenders
Hungarian expatriate footballers
Expatriate footballers in Belgium
Hungarian expatriate sportspeople in Belgium
Hungary international footballers